Leavenworth Ranger Station, also known as the Wenatchee River Ranger District, in Leavenworth, Washington was built during 1937-38 by the Civilian Conservation Corps.    It was designed by the United States Forest Service's Region 6 USDA Forest Svce. Architecture Group in Rustic architecture.  The listing includes nine contributing buildings on a  area.

It was listed on the National Register of Historic Places in 1986.

Contributing Properties
The listing contains 9 contributing properties, built between 1937 and 1939:
 The Ranger Station Office, built 1937-1938
 The Residence #1245, built 1937-1938
 The Garage #1586, built 1937-1938
 The Residence #1243, built 1938-1939
 The Garage for Residence #1243, built 1938-1939
 The Automotive Shop, 
 The Equipment Storage Building, built 1937-1938
 The Gas House, 
 The Fire Warehouse,

See also
Leavenworth National Fish Hatchery, also NRHP-listed

References

Civilian Conservation Corps in Washington (state)
United States Forest Service ranger stations
Government buildings on the National Register of Historic Places in Washington (state)
Buildings and structures completed in 1938
Buildings and structures in Chelan County, Washington
Rustic architecture in Washington (state)
National Register of Historic Places in Chelan County, Washington
1938 establishments in Washington (state)